James Agalga is a Ghanaian politician and member of the Seventh Parliament of the Fourth Republic of Ghana representing the Builsa North Constituency in the Upper East Region on the ticket of the National Democratic Congress. Agalga was the Deputy Minister for Interior under the John Mahama Administration. He is currently the Deputy Ranking Member on Parliament's Defense and Interior Committee.

Early life and education 
James was born in Chuchuliga in the Upper East Region of Ghana on 10 June 1979. He attended University of Ghana where he graduated with LLB Hons in 2002. He also obtained his B.L from the Ghana School of Law in 2004. He also graduated with an M.A in Conflict, Peace and Security in 2018.

Politics 
He is a member of the National Democratic Congress.

Career 
He was the Managing Partner of Law Temple from 2008 to 2013. He was an Associate at the Center for Public Interest Law. He was also the Barrister at NDEZEB Law Consult.

Personal life 
He is a Catholic.

Committees 
He was part of Members Holding Offices of Profit Committee, Constitutional, Legal and Parliamentary Affairs Committee and also Appointments Committee.

References

Ghanaian MPs 2017–2021
1979 births
Living people
Ghanaian Roman Catholics
National Democratic Congress (Ghana) politicians
Ghanaian MPs 2021–2025